Mavli Junction railway station is a railway station in Udaipur district, Rajasthan. Its code is MVJ. It serves Mavli town. The station consists of five platforms. Passenger Express and Superfast trains halt here.

Trains

The following trains halt at Mavli Junction railway station in both directions:

 Bandra Terminus–Udaipur Express
 Bandra Terminus–Udaipur Superfast Express
 Veer Bhumi Chittaurgarh Express
 Ratlam–Udaipur City Express
 Udaipur City–Jaipur Intercity Express
 Udaipur City–Haridwar Express
 Udaipur City–Delhi Sarai Rohilla Rajasthan Humsafar Express
 Ananya Express
 Udaipur City–New Jalpaiguri Weekly Express
 Udaipur City–Kamakhya Kavi Guru Express
 Okha–Nathdwara Express
 Khajuraho–Udaipur City Express
 Mewar Express
 Udaipur City–Patliputra Humsafar Express
 Chetak Express
 Shalimar–Udaipur City Weekly Express
 Mavli Jn-Marwar Jn a pair of passenger trains (originate and terminate at Mavli Jn)
 Udaipur City–Kota Jn Holiday special train Daily (this train is withdrawn completely)

References

Railway stations in Udaipur district
Ajmer railway division